HK is a common abbreviation for Hong Kong, a former British crown colony and current special administrative region of the People's Republic of China.

HK may also refer to:

Businesses and organisations
 HK Magazine, a Hong Kong-based English-language weekly
 HKScan, formerly Helsingin Kauppiaat, a Finnish meat producer
 Handel og Kontor I Norge, the Union of Employees in Commerce and Offices in Norway
 Handels- og Kontorfunktionærernes Forbund i Danmark, the National Union of Commercial and Clerical Employees in Denmark
 Handknattleiksfélag Kópavogs, an Icelandic sports club
 Harman Kardon, a manufacturer of home and car audio equipment
 Heckler & Koch, a German firearms company
 Four Star Aviation (IATA airline designator)

In science and technology
 Metric horsepower, a measure of power (1 hk = 0.9863 hp (UK, US) = 0.7355 kW)
 Hefnerkerze, an old photometric unit of luminous intensity
 Hexokinase, an enzyme
 Sobolev space Hk, in mathematics

Other uses
 .hk, Hong Kong's country top-level Internet domain
 HK$, the Hong Kong dollar
 HK-47, a fictional assassin droid from Star Wars video games
 Hello Kitty, a cartoon character by Sanrio
 School of Hard Knocks
 Hell's Kitchen (disambiguation)
 Hunter-killer (disambiguation)
 Henock "HK" Sileshi, a member of the group Brockhampton
 Hollow Knight, a game by Team Cherry
 Horowhenua-Kapiti, a region of New Zealand's North Island